Ivan Roy Schwab is a professor of ophthalmology at the University of California Davis School of Medicine.

Dr. Schwab completed his undergraduate degree at West Virginia University and received his M.D. from the West Virginia University School of Medicine. Dr. Schwab then completed a residency in ophthalmology at California Pacific Medical Center and a fellowship in corneal surgery at University of California San Francisco in 1982. He is a Fellow of the American College of Surgeons.

Dr. Schwab is currently the director of corneal services at UC Davis Medical Center and in addition to clinical and teaching duties conducts research in biomaterials. His past work includes the development of a bioengineered artificial cornea which can be used to treat patients with severe corneal damage.

In addition to the diagnosis and treatment of ocular disorders, Dr. Schwab has an interest in comparative ophthalmology, examining the visual systems of animals such as stomatopods, mysid shrimp, and sharks and has published a book on the evolution of the eye.  His work on why woodpeckers don't get headaches was honored with an Ig Nobel Prize in 2006.

References

Year of birth missing (living people)
Living people
American ophthalmologists
West Virginia University alumni
West Virginia University School of Medicine alumni
University of California, San Francisco alumni
University of California, Davis faculty